APLMA is an acronym which can refer to:

Asia Pacific Leaders Malaria Alliance, a health organisation
Asia Pacific Loan Market Association, a finance trade association